The Percopsiformes  are a small order of ray-finned fishes, comprising the trout-perch and its allies. It contains just ten extant species, grouped into seven genera and three families. Five of these genera are monotypic

They inhabit freshwater habitats in North America. They are grouped together because of technical  characteristics of their internal anatomy, and the different species may appear quite different externally.

 Order Percopsiformes Berg 1937
 Genus †Lateopisciculus Murray & Wilson1996
 Genus †Percopsiformorum [Otolith]
 Suborder Percopsoidei Berg 1937
 Family †Libotoniidae Wilson & Williams 1992
 Genus †Libotonius Wilson 1977
 Family Percopsidae Regan 1911 [Percopsides Agassiz 1850; Erismatopteridae Jordan 1905]
 Genus †Massamorichthys Murray 1996
 Genus †Amphiplaga Cope 1877
 Genus †Erismatopterus Cope 1870
 Genus Percopsis Agassiz 1849 [Columbia Eigenmann & Eigenmann 1892 non Rang 1834; Columatilla Whitley 1940; Salmoperca Thompson 1850]
 Suborder Aphredoderoidei Berg 1937 [Amblyopsoidei Regan 1911; Aphredoderoidea; Amblyopsoidea]
 Family Aphredoderidae Bonaparte 1832 (Pirate perches)
 Genus †Trichophanes Cope 1872
 Genus Aphredoderus Lesueur 1833 ex Cuvier & Valenciennes 1833 [Sternotremia Nelson 1876; Asternotremia Nelson ex Jordan 1877; Scolopsis Gilliams 1824 non Cuvier 1814]
 Family Amblyopsidae Bonaparte 1832 [Hypsaeidae Storer 1846] (Cavefishes)
 Genus Typhlichthys Girard 1859 (Southern cavefish)
 Genus Speoplatyrhinus Cooper & Kuehne 1974 (Alabama cavefish)
 Genus Forbesichthys Jordan 1929 [Forbesella Jordan & Evermann 1927 non Herdman 1891 non Lacaze-Duthiers & Delage 1892] (Spring cavefish)
 Genus Chologaster Agassiz 1853 (Swampfish)
 Genus Amblyopsis de Kay 1842 [Troglichthys Eigenmann 1899; Poecilosomus Swainson 1839]

References

 
Taxa named by Lev Berg
Extant Campanian first appearances
Ray-finned fish orders